Moradabad is a city, commissionary and municipal corporation in Moradabad district of Indian state of Uttar Pradesh.

Founded by Rustam Khan, the governor of Katehar under the Mughal emperor Shahjahan, Moradabad is named after prince Murad Bakhsh, the youngest son of the emperor. Soon after its establishment, the city replaced Sambhal as the seat of the governor of Katehar. Moradabad was subsequently annexed into the Kingdom of Rohilkhand by Ali Mohammed Khan in 1740. The city came under the control of Oudh State in 1774 after the fall of Rohillas in the First Rohilla War and was then ceded to the British East India Company by the Nawab of Oudh in 1801. In the early nineteenth century, the Rohilkhand area was divided among the Rampur State and two districts - Bareilly and Moradabad; Moradabad became the headquarters of the latter.

Moradabad was connected with railway lines during the latter half of the nineteenth century. A line connecting Moradabad to Chandausi was built in 1872 and it was continued up to Bareilly in 1873. The Bareilly-Moradabad chord via Rampur was completed in 1894, which was extended to Saharanpur in 1886. A branch line to Aligarh via Chandausi was opened in 1894, while Moradabad was linked to Ghaziabad in 1900. Moradabad is the divisional headquarters of Northern Railway (NR). The city is known as Pital Nagri ("Brass City") for its famous brass handicrafts industry. In October 2014, Livemint included Moradabad in its list of "25 Emerging Cities To Watch Out For In 2025".

History 
Moradabad was originally called Chaupala. It was a stronghold of the Katehria Rajputs, who had built a mud-brick fort overlooking the Ganges. Little remains of the settlement from this period, except for some monuments to widows of the Katehria chieftains. Under the Mughal Empire, Chaupala was the seat of a pargana; it is mentioned in the Ain-i-Akbari as being part of the sarkar of Sambhal. It produced a revenue of 1,340,812 dams for the imperial treasury and it provided a force of 500 infantry and 100 cavalry to the Mughal army.

The modern city of Moradabad was founded by Rustam Khan Dakhani, Mughal governor of Sambhal, during the reign of Shah Jahan. In 1624, Raja Ramsukh, leader of the Katehrias, had rebelled and invaded the Tarai region. The raja of Kumaon had complained to Shah Jahan, who then sent Rustam Khan to deal with the disturbance. Rustam Khan did so "with great vigor": he not only captured Chaupala and put Ramsukh to death, but also refounded the city as Rustamnagar (named after himself), building a new fort and great mosque and making the place his new capital. The ruins of which were still visible as of the early 20th century in the form of a wall along the riverfront. The mosque is also extant, with an inscription dated to 1632. The fort and mosque remain among the oldest major monuments in Moradabad today.

The name "Rustamnagar" was short-lived, however. Shah Jahan soon called Rustam Khan to his court and demanded an explanation for why he had exceeded his orders. In an attempt to placate the emperor, Rustam Khan said that he had named it Muradabad in honor of the young prince, Murad Bakhsh. The emperor was satisfied and permitted Rustam Khan to remain in charge of the new city, which now came to replace Sambhal as the Mughal governors' capital, and the name Muradabad (or Moradabad) has been in use ever since.

Smart City
Moradabad was figured amongst the PM Narendra Modi's ambitious 100 Smart City list in India in 2015.

Climate 
During summers the temperature is usually from 43 °C to 30 °C and during winters it is from 25 °C to 5 °C.

Moradabad has a history of flash floods occurring due to the over-flooding of Ramganga river.

Demographics

According to the 2011 census Moradabad City has a population of 887,871. The population of Moradabad district was 4,772,006, roughly equal to the nation of Singapore or the US state of Alabama. It is the second most populated district in the state of Uttar Pradesh. This gives it a ranking of 26th in India (out of a total of 640). Its population growth rate over the decade 2001–2011 was 25.25%.	

Moradabad has a sex ratio of 903 females for every 1000 males, and a literacy rate of 58.67%.

Famous cuisine
Moradabad is known for its historic dishes.
 Moradabadi Daal
 Moradabadi Biryani

Education

Higher education institutions in Moradabad

Moradabad Institute of Technology
Teerthanker Mahaveer University 
IFTM University
Hindu College

Police training academy
Dr. Bhim Rao Ambedkar Police Academy, Moradabad is situated in the heart of Uttar Pradesh. Indian Police Services Officer and State Police Service officers of UP cadre and Uttrakhand Cadre are trained here before the appointment.

The Police Training College was earlier known as Police Training School (PTS), established in Allahabad in 1878 under an Assistant Superintendent of Police. It was shifted to Moradabad in 1901. The academy has two other police colleges under its administration: Police Training College and Police Training School. The former is used to train police officers of the rank of inspector and sub-inspector, and the latter is used to train head constables and constables.

Provincial Armed Constabulary
Besides the above Inspector-General of Police, western zone, Provincial Armed Constabulary (PAC) also sits in Moradabad.

Moradabad has Battalion headquarters of 9/23/24 Bn. of U.P. Provincial Armed Constabulary, also have their offices here. Moradabad is the largest police establishment of U.P. Police after Lucknow.

Economy

Moradabad is a major industrial city of Uttar Pradesh and one of India's biggest export hubs. Its metalcrafts industry alone accounts for more than 40% of total handicraft exports from India.

In 2007, Moradabad's export turnover was ₹3200 crores which had increased to ₹4000 crores in 2012.

By 2018 it had a metalcraft business turnover of ₹9700 crores out of which ₹5400 crores was export revenue and the same year Moradabad was counted amongst India's manufacturing hubs by The Economic Times.

And by the year 2020 it had increased further to reach ₹15000 crores out of which ₹10000 crores was export revenue.

In October 2014, Livemint included Moradabad in its list of "25 Emerging Cities To Watch Out For In 2025".

Export 
Moradabad is popularly known as the Brass City of the country. Countries like Britain, the US, Middle East, Germany and Canada import brassware from Moradabad. In Moradabad, there are about 600 export units and 9000 industries in the district. Moradabad exports goods worth Rs. 4500 crore yearly. Products such as iron sheet, metal wares, aluminum, artworks and glassware are exported. The export of mint is done in several crores from Moradabad. Due to upsurge of exports and popularity in foreign particularly in America, Europe, Italy and other countries, a large number of exporters are launching their units and started their export. Moradabad is one of the seven industrial corridors declared by  the  State Government in Industrial Policy 1999–2002.

Mohammed Yar Khan is known as the founder of Moradabad's brass industry; he migrated from Afghanistan in the 1800s and started the export industry. He was awarded various medals from British Empire exhibitions in United Kingdom.

Special Economic Zone
Moradabad Special Economic Zone (SEZ), the only Uttar Pradesh Government developed SEZ in northern India, headed by the Development Commissioner, Noida SEZ and locally governed by the Assistant Development Commissioner, was set up in 2003 at Pakbara – Dingarpur Road in Moradabad on a 421.565-acre plot of land. Government of UP, through UPSIDC, being developers to this SEZ project has so far invested a sum of ₹1100 million on its development. Moradabad SEZ provides excellent infrastructure, supportive services and sector specific facilities for the Handicraft Trade. Proximity to Delhi/ NCR and availability of skilled and dedicated manpower makes it ideal for setting up various industries in Handicrafts & its allied filed. Moradabad SEZ was operationalized since April, 2007 when it started with only one unit, however till today in spite of the global slowdown in the handicraft trade for past four years; this zone has now 22 operational Units.
Moradabad SEZ has 465 developed plots of varying sizes. Future expansion of this has been strategically planned and soon it will be available for few more export sectors.

Infrastructure, supportive services and trade related facilities have been substantially upgraded during the last few years. Moradabad SEZ offers access to the global telecommunication network, uninterrupted power supply and efficient local transport system. An ultra-modern RSU Telephone Exchange has been installed in the Zone, besides the availability of all the mobile frequencies in and around the zone through various mobile communication towers. An independent feeder line has since been provided for uninterrupted power supply, the reliability and quality of power supply has improved with the pre-commissioned 32 / 11 KVA / 5.0 MVA  Power Sub-station within Moradabad SEZ. Proximity to Delhi/ NCR provides easy access to the financial and commercial infrastructure of the capital. Customs Wing ensures prompt and on the spot clearances of export/import consignments through web based system called "sezonline".

Transportation

Road

The following National Highways and State Highways pass through or are connected with Moradabad:

National Highway 24 – connects New Delhi to Lucknow via Ghaziabad, Bareilly, Shahjahanpur and Sitapur. It has been made four-lane between Moradabad and New Delhi. Four-laning of the highway between Bareilly and Sitapur is underway. From Sarai Kale Khan Delhi to Hapur construction of an access-controlled expressway is underway, and from Hapur to Moradabad work of six-laning has started.  
It is essentially from Delhi via Ghaziabad and Moradabad to Rampur. Part of this highway is also a part of the AH2 (Asian Highway 2), which connects Denpasar, Indonesia to Merak and Singapore to Khosravi, Iran.
National Highway 509 – Also known as National Highway 93, it connects Moradabad to Agra via Chandausi, Aligarh and Hathras.
National Highway 734 – connects Moradabad with Jaspur Uttrakhand. Union Minister of Road and Transport Nitin Gadkari on 20 February 2019 laid down the foundation stone of four-laning of this highway.
State Highway 43 – connects Moradabad to the historical city of Badaun, which is 102 km away, and Farrukhabad, which is 210 km away, via Bisauli. It also extends to Kanpur.
State Highway 49 – connects Moradabad to Haridwar, merging into State Highway 78 at Dhampur.
State Highway 76 – connects Moradabad to Bijnor via Noorpur.
State Highway 78 – connects Moradabad to Amroha via Pakbara.
MDR65 W – connects Moradabad to Kashipur via Thakurdwara.
Moradabad–Sambhal four-lane highway.

Rail

Moradabad railway station is one of the major railway stations of Indian Railways. It lies on Lucknow-Moradabad line, Delhi-Moradabad line and Moradabad-Ambala line. More than 250 trains pass through and stop at Moradabad Railway Station every day. It is directly connected with Delhi, Lucknow, Kanpur, Agra, Aligarh, Ghaziabad, Jaipur, Jodhpur, Haridwar, Dehradun, Amritsar, Ludhiana, Ambala, Guwahati, Dibrugarh, Kolkata, Jamshedpur, Varanasi, Ahmedabad, Patna.
Shatabdi Express, Rajdhani Express, Garib-Rath Express Many Super fast, mail and passenger trains stop at Moradabad.
Moradabad is called an inter-change station due to a five line junction. Moradabad Railway Station is One of the Oldest Railway Station Of India. It was built in 1873, and was electrified in 2012.

Moradabad railway station was the main station built by Oudh and Rohilkhand Railway.

Amenities
Moradabad railway station is category 'A' railway station. It has a tourist information centre, post office, telegraph office, General Railway Police Office, computerized reservation counters, retiring room, vegetarian and non vegetarian refreshment rooms, tea stall and bookstall. It also has the Tatkal seat booking counter.

Electrification
Electrification of the 636 km (395 mi) long Mughasarai-Moradabad line was completed in 2013.

Air
Moradabad Airport is under construction. The nearest international airport is Indira Gandhi International Airport, New Delhi, 178 km away.

Bareilly Airport is a nearest major domestic airport to Moradabad which is located around 85km from Moradabad,it is connected to cities like Mumbai, New Delhi and Bengaluru with direct flights

Media
Newspapers published in Moradabad include Dainik Jagran, Amar Ujala, Patrika, Moradabad Pages

Notable people

 Zainul Abideen, ultramarathon runner
 Ponty Chadha, businessperson
 Piyush Chawla, Indian cricketer
 S. T. Hasan, M.P of Moradabad 
 Javed Jaffrey, Bollywood actor
 Arun Lal, retired Indian cricketer
 Jwala Prasad Mishra (1861-1916 CE), author and editor of classical Sanskrit texts
 Hullad Moradabadi, Hindi poet, humourist and satirist
 Jigar Moradabadi, aka Ali Sikandar, Urdu poet and ghazal writer.
 Naeem-ud-Deen Muradabadi, jurist, scholar and mufti
 Sufi Amba Prasad, nationalist and pan-Islamist leader 
 Naina Singh, actor
 Robert Vadra, businessman and husband of Priyanka Gandhi

See also
Rohtak
Gurgaon
Meerut
New Moradabad
Fatanpur, Moradabad
1888 Moradabad hailstorm
1980 Moradabad riots

References

External links

 Moradabad Pages Moradabad Local News

 
Cities and towns in Moradabad district
Cities in Uttar Pradesh
Populated places established in 1625